Keegan Kuhn is an American documentary filmmaker, director, producer, and professional musician. He is best known for co-directing the documentary films Cowspiracy: The Sustainability Secret and What the Health, along with Kip Andersen.

Career and work 
Kuhn is the owner of First Spark Media, a digital film production company, which focuses on creating films surrounding social justice issues for companies and non-profits. He also started First Spark Gear, a camera accessory company. In 2018, it was announced that he would be a partner for a project entitled "Fertile Ground: Inspiring Dialogue About Food Access" that received a Bloomberg Philanthropies grant to use art as a medium to help local communities and inform nutrition policy in Jackson, Mississippi.

His work on films have taken him to extreme locations, from the Alaskan wilderness to the American West, where he filmed the remaining wild horses in the United States. In addition to topics like environmental destruction and animal rescue, his work has involved subjects like gender inequality, Buddhism, and endurance sports.

Kuhn is the creator of educational music project True Nature.

Personal life 
Kuhn currently resides in the East Bay region of San Francisco with his wife Shani Campbell, a Certified Cat Behaviorist. For most of his life he has been working with nonprofit organizations and assisting in social justice movements. He has been vegan for decades.
He spends his day biking and kayaking as much as possible.

Filmography 
Kuhn's film projects include:

 Turlock (2013, director)
 Cowspiracy: The Sustainability Secret (2014, director, producer, writer, cinematographer, composer)
 What the Health (2017, director, producer, writer)
 They're Trying To Kill Us (2021, producer)

He was also interviewed in the 2021 documentary Milked, which was influenced by Cowspiracy.

Kuhn is currently producing a documentary entitled The End of Medicine, which is directed by Alex Lockwood. Rooney Mara and Joaquin Phoenix are involved in the project.

Bibliography

Awards 

 2018 Cinema for Peace Award Nominee, Most Valuable Documentary of the Year, What the Health (2014), shared with Kip Andersen

References 

American film directors
American film producers
American musicians
Living people
Year of birth missing (living people)